Mohamed Naceur Jelili (born 2 February 1950) is a Tunisian handball player. He competed at the 1972 Summer Olympics and the 1976 Summer Olympics.

References

1950 births
Living people
Tunisian male handball players
Olympic handball players of Tunisia
Handball players at the 1972 Summer Olympics
Handball players at the 1976 Summer Olympics
Place of birth missing (living people)